Eucalyptus blaxlandii, commonly known as Blaxland's stringybark, is a tree that is endemic to  south eastern New South Wales. It is a stringybark with lance-shaped adult leaves, flower buds arranged in group of nine or eleven, white flowers and hemispherical fruit.

Description
It has persistent, rough, dark brown to greyish stringy bark on the trunk and larger branches and smooth, whitish bark on the thinner ones. Flowering has been observed in March and November and the flowers are white.

Taxonomy and naming
Eucalyptus blaxlandii was first formally described in 1919 by Joseph Maiden and Richard Hind Cambage from a specimen collected at Blackheath by Maiden. The description was published in Journal and Proceedings of the Royal Society of New South Wales. The specific epithet (blaxlandii) honours Gregory Blaxland, "who was leader of the first party to cross the Blue Mountains, where many trees of this species are found".

Distribution and habitat
Blaxland's stringybark grows in forest on sandstone on the Central and Southern Tablelands from Nullo Mountain near Kandos and south to the Dampier State Forest near Bodalla.

References 

blaxlandii
Myrtales of Australia
Flora of New South Wales
Plants described in 1919
Taxa named by Joseph Maiden